ASV Records was a London-based record label set up by Harley Usill, founder of Argo Records, Decca producer and former Argo general manager, Kevin Daly, and producer Jack Boyce, after Argo's parent company Decca was bought by PolyGram in 1980. ASV stood for "Academy Sound and Vision". The label was bought by the Sanctuary Records Group in May 1999.

ASV, which was founded in London in 1981, was mainly a classical label, but its catalogue included Bing Crosby, Cole Porter, The Ink Spots, and The Boswell Sisters. Starting in 1986, ASV had an imprint called Living Era, created by Kevin Daly, which specialized in reissuing recordings (particularly American jazz recordings) that are in the public domain in the UK, which are all at least 50 years old. It also showcased American pop music, American country music, British dance bands, and British nostalgia.

Much of ASV's classical catalogue was reissued on Sanctuary's Resonance budget label. Sanctuary's UK recorded music business was shut down shortly after Universal Music Group bought the firm in 2007. This also included the ASV and ASV/Living Era imprints.

As a fulfilment of conditions imposed by the European Commission following UMG's acquisition of most of EMI in 2012, Universal sold Sanctuary to BMG Rights Management in 2013. Thus, Warner Music Group, through its Alternative Distribution Alliance division, handles the catalogue of reissues from ASV's artists' releases on Sanctuary's behalf after BMG designated ADA in March 2017 as its distributor.

Roster

Conductors:
 Enrique Bátiz Campbell, Mexico
 Francesco D'Avalos, Italy
 David Allinson, United States
 Ross Pople, New Zealand
 Christoph Eschenbach, Germany
 Jane Glover, United Kingdom
 Andrew Carwood, United Kingdom
 Loris Tjeknavorian, Iran, Austria
 Steven Sloane, United States

Performers:
 London Festival Orchestra
 London Philharmonic Orchestra
 Mexico City Philharmonic Orchestra
 Nikolai Demidenko
 Robert Gibbs
 Young Uck Kim
 John Lill
 Jorge Luis Prats
 Julian Lloyd Webber
 Lindsay String Quartet
 The Cardinall's Musick
 Ensemble 360
 Gordon Fergus-Thompson
 New Chamber Opera Ensemble
 Emma Johnson
 Sandro Ivo Bartoli

See also 
 Lists of record labels

References

External links
 ASV's Living Era series discography

Classical music record labels
Jazz record labels
British record labels